The 20th South American Youth Championships in Athletics were held
in Santiago, Chile at the Estadio Nacional Julio Martínez Prádanos from October 9–10, 2010.  A detailed report on the
results was given.

Medal summary
Medal winners are published, and
complete results can be found on the Fedachi, on the Fecodatle, and on the "World Junior Athletics History"
website.

Men salto triplo

†: This is the relay team announced to compete by CBAt. Neither the order nor whether there were any substitutions is known. The announced Carlos Eduardo Pereira did not appear in the start lists.

Women

†: This is the relay team announced to compete by CBAt.  Neither the order nor whether there were any substitutions is known.

Medal table
The medal count was published.

Team trophies
The placing tables for team trophy (overall team, men and women categories) were published.

Total

Male

Female

Participation (unofficial)
Detailed result lists can be found on the "World Junior Athletics History" website.  An unofficial count yields the number of about 278 athletes from about 13 countries:  

 (48)
 (12)
 (66)
 (56)
 (18)
 (18)
 (1)
 Panamá (3)
 (7)
 Perú (26)
 (1)
 (6)
 (16)

References

External links
World Junior Athletics History
Official championships website

2010
2010 in Chilean sport
South American U18
International athletics competitions hosted by Chile
2010 in youth sport